= USC football =

USC football refers to one of two NCAA Division I FBS college football programs:

- South Carolina Gamecocks football of the Southeastern Conference
- Southern California Trojans football of the Big Ten Conference
